Kung Fu Kid, known in Japan as , is a Master System video game. It is the follow-up to the Sega SG-1000 title Dragon Wang. Players control Wang as he faces an onslaught of enemies using his martial arts skills and wall jumping technique.

The Brazilian release, published by Tectoy, was renamed Sapo Xulé O Mestre do Kung Fu and as with Psycho Fox and Astro Warrior, replaced the main character with the cartoon frog character Sapo Xulé.

Reception

Computer Gaming World criticized Kung Fu Kids "incredibly contrived play-mechanics" (including a lobster that would give the player extra powers) and the "tiny and cartoon-like" graphics, and mocked the Engrish documentation that stated that the player would fight "the unnaturally evil one".

References

External links

1987 video games
Master System games
Master System-only games
Sega beat 'em ups
Side-scrolling beat 'em ups
Video games developed in Japan